Gristhorpe railway station was a minor railway station on the Yorkshire Coast Line from Scarborough to Hull, serving the villages of Gristhorpe and Lebberston, and was opened on 5 October 1846 by the York and North Midland Railway. It closed on 16 February 1959.

Parts of both platforms survive at the site (though the line itself is now single track), along with a brick signal box (to work the manually-operated level crossing gates and protecting signals) and the now privately occupied station house.

References

External links
 Gristhorpe station on navigable 1947 O. S. map

Disused railway stations in the Borough of Scarborough
Railway stations in Great Britain opened in 1846
Railway stations in Great Britain closed in 1959
Stations on the Hull to Scarborough line
1846 establishments in England
Former York and North Midland Railway stations
George Townsend Andrews railway stations